Wilhelm Schulz may refer to:

 Friedrich Wilhelm Schulz (1797–1860), German officer and radical-democratic publisher in Hesse
 Wilhelm Phillip Daniel Schulz (1805–1877), German mine engineer and geologist

See also
 Wilhelm Schulze (1920–2002), German professor of veterinary medicine